The Alamogordo Woman's Club is a women's club based in New Mexico. It operates under the auspices of the New Mexico Federation of Women's Clubs (NMFWC) (now known as GFWC New Mexico). The club was created to provide Alamogordo women a way to serve their community. Of note was the Alamogordo Woman's Club's providing books to school libraries.

The building
The Alamogordo Woman's Club was built in 1937 in the Pueblo Revival style by the Works Progress Administration (WPA)

It is a one-story  building built by Works Progress Administration workers.  It was "most likely designed by the project foreman, as were other WPA-funded women's clubs in New Mexico."

Its main hall includes three Federal Arts Project paintings by J.R. Willis, a New Mexico artist.  Joseph Roy Willis (1876-1960) was based in Albuquerque.

It was one of several structures in the Tularosa Basin to be built by the WPA. Others WPA buildings are the Alamogordo Post Office (now Otero County Administration Building), and parts of the New Mexico School for the Blind campus.

The Alamogordo Woman's Club building was listed on the National Register of Historic Places in 2003.

References

External links

Women's clubs in the United States
Women's organizations based in the United States
Clubhouses on the National Register of Historic Places in New Mexico
Pueblo Revival architecture in New Mexico
National Register of Historic Places in Otero County, New Mexico
History of women in New Mexico